Edme-Sébastien Jeaurat (14 September 1725 – 7 March 1803) was a French astronomer most notable for publishing a map of the 64 stars of the Pleiades in 1786. He was a member of the French Academy of Sciences.  He originally studied art, receiving a medal from the French Academy of Painting and published an art book "Essai de perspective à l'usage des artistes" in 1750.  His parents were Edme Jeaurat and Marie-Charlotte born Le Clerc. He was the first founder of various settlements that were taken over by the École Militaire in favor of astronomy. He was elected a Foreign Honorary Member of the American Academy of Arts and Sciences in 1783.

References

External links
Edme-Sébastien Jeaurat at arthistoricum.net 

1725 births
1803 deaths
Scientists from Paris
18th-century French astronomers
Fellows of the American Academy of Arts and Sciences
Members of the French Academy of Sciences